David Pulsifer (22 September 1802, in Ipswich, Massachusetts – 9 August 1894, in Augusta, Maine), was a historian and a preserver of old records.

Biography
He studied in the district schools, and then went to Salem to learn bookbinding, where, in handling old records, his taste for antiquarian research was first developed. Subsequently, he served as clerk in county courts and transcribed several ancient books of records. In 1853 the governor of Massachusetts called the attention of the executive council to the perishing condition of the early records and recommended that the two oldest volumes of the general court records should be printed at the expense of the state. Ephraim M. Wright and Nathaniel B. Shurtleff were appointed to take charge of the printing, and Pulsifer, who was acknowledged to be especially skilful in deciphering the chirography of the 17th century, was charged with the copying.

Pulsifer had previously copied the first volume for the American Antiquarian Society. Of his work, Samuel F. Haven, in his introduction to the printed records in the Archaeologia, wrote that Pulsifer "unites the qualities of an expert in chirography with a genuine antiquarian taste and much familiarity with ancient records.”

Works
Pulsifer edited:

Records of the Colony of New Plymouth in New England (vols. ix. to xii., Boston, 1859–61)
The Simple Cobbler of Aggawam in America (1843)
A Poetical Epistle to George Washington, Esq., Commander-in-Chief of the Armies of the United States of America, by Rev. Charles H. Wharton, D. D., first published anonymously in Annapolis in 1779 (1881)
The Christian's A. B. C., an original manuscript, written in the 18th century by an unknown author (1883)
Inscriptions from the Burying-Grounds in Salem, Mass. (Boston, 1837)

He wrote:
Guide to Boston and Vicinity (1866)
Account of the Battle of Bunker Hill, with General John Burgoyne's Account (1872)

Notes

References

1802 births
1894 deaths
19th-century American historians
19th-century American male writers
American curators
Bookbinders
American male non-fiction writers